The men's 200 metres T61 event at the 2020 Summer Paralympics in Tokyo, took place on 3 September 2021.

Records
Prior to the competition, the existing records were as follows:

Results
The final took place on 3 September 2021, at 19:42:

References

Men's 200 metres T61
2021 in men's athletics